The Battle of the Sink Hole was fought on May 24, 1815, after the official end of the War of 1812, between Missouri Rangers and Sauk Indians led by Black Hawk. According to Robert McDouall, the British commander in the area, the Sauk had not received official word from the British that the Treaty of Ghent had ended the war with the U.S. 

The battle was fought in a low spot near the mouth of the Cuivre River in Missouri, site of the  present-day city of Old Monroe in what is now Lincoln County near Fort Howard and Fort Cap au Gris. An ambush by  the Sauk of a company of rangers led to a prolonged siege: seven Rangers (including their commander, Captain Peter Craig) and one Sauk were killed. Conflicting accounts of the action were given by John Shaw and by Black Hawk.

After the battle, in 1816 Black Hawk entered into negotiations with the US government, ultimately reaffirming the Treaty of St. Louis.

References

External links
Geology of the War of 1812: Terrain Influences on the Battle of the Sink Hole, Missouri Territory
Michael Dickey, "The Forgotten War: Missouri from 1812-1815", Friends of Arrow Rock website, September 2013
Battle of Sinkhole - Missouri Speleological Survey (Publication)

Sink Hole
May 1815 events
Sink Hole